Beshak (also Romanized as Bashak) is a village in Shonbeh Rural District, Shonbeh and Tasuj District, Dashti County, Bushehr Province, Iran. At the 2006 census, its population was 21, in 4 families.

References 

Populated places in Dashti County